Robert Acton (July 26, 1867 – November 22, 1900) was Irish-American college football player and coach and physician. He attended Harvard Medical School and he played football as a left guard for the Crimson from 1893 to 1895 and was also a member of the rowing team. Acton was the fifth head football coach at Vanderbilt University, serving for three seasons, from 1896 to 1898, and compiling a record of 10–7–3. He died on November 22, 1900, at Presbyterian Hospital in Manhattan after an overdose of morphine.

Head coaching record

References

External links
 

1867 births
1900 deaths
19th-century players of American football
19th-century American physicians
20th-century American physicians
American football guards
Harvard Crimson football players
Vanderbilt Commodores football coaches
Harvard Medical School alumni
Irish emigrants to the United States (before 1923)
Irish players of American football
Sportspeople from County Cork
Physicians from New York City
Drug-related deaths in New York City